Nanming District is one of 6 urban districts of the prefecture-level city of Guiyang, the capital of Guizhou Province, Southwest China. 
 Nanming District serves as an economic powerhouse for the city, bringing in GDP of over 30.17 Billion Yuan as of 2011.  As of 2004, the district is the second highest ranked economic zone in Guizhou Province according to China's National Bureau of Statistics. It is home to the Guiyang Longdongbao International Airport.

Administrative Divisions
The zoning code for Nanming District is 520102, with its district seat located on Jiàn Street.  Nanming District has 18 subdistrict offices, 3 townships, and 1 ethnic township under its jurisdiction:

Sub-Districts 
 Xinhua Road Sub-District
 Xihu Road Sub-District
 Shuikou Temple Sub-District
 Zhonghua South Road Sub-District
 Hebin Sub-District
 Zunyi Road Sub-District
 Xingguan Road Sub-District
 Shachong Road Sub-District
 Wangcheng Street Sub-District
 Taiciqiao Street Sub-District
 Xiangya Street Sub-District
 Youzha Street Sub-District
 Zhongcaosi Street Sub-District
 Erge Street Sub-District
 Longdongbao Street Sub-District
 Huaguoyuan Street Sub-District
 Xiaochehe Street Sub-District
 Wulichong Street Sub-District

Townships 
 Houchao Township
 Yunguan Township
 Xiaobi Buyi and Miao Nationality Township
 Yongle Township.

Economy 
Guizhou Power Grid, the Guizhou subsidiary of China Southern Power Grid is headquartered in Nanming District, as is Sinopec Guizhou, the Guizhou subsidiary of Sinopec.

Notable Buildings 
Nanming District is home to provincial and prefecture-level government buildings including:
 Guizhou Provincial Committee of the Communist Party of China
 Guizhou TV Station
 Guiyang TV Station
 Guiyang City Library

The district is also home to various research and academic institutions including, but not limited to:
 Guiyang College
 Guiyang College of Finance and Economics (not the same as Guiyang College)
 Guizhou Education College,
 Guizhou Light Industry Vocational and Technical College
 Guizhou Police Vocational and Technical College.

Also within the district are various tourist attractions including:
 Jiaxiu Tower - built in the 25th year of Wanli Ming Dynasty
 Hebin Park
 Qianming Temple
 Guanfengtai Meteorological Observatory built in the 32nd year of Wanli Ming Dynasty.

References

External links

County-level divisions of Guizhou
Guiyang